The 1982 ABC Under-18 Championship was the seventh edition of the Asian Basketball Confederation (ABC)'s Junior Championship. The games were held at Quezon City, Philippines from October 4–17, 1982.

Venue
The games were held at Araneta Coliseum, located in Quezon City.

Preliminary round

Group A

Group B

Final round

Championship

The results from preliminary round with teams in the final round was carried over to the final round. Ties were broken by points differences.

References

FIBA Asia Under-18 Championship
1982 in Asian basketball
International basketball competitions hosted by the Philippines
October 1980 sports events in Asia